Signs is the second album by the English electronic music duo Badmarsh & Shri, released in 2001.

The duo parted ways after the release of Signs.

Reception

AllMusic criticized the album for being slow and of poor quality for the first few tracks, but asserted that the duo has achieved a distinctive style and complimented Shri's multi-instrumental versatility. The Encyclopedia of Popular Music deemed the album "excellent."

Track listing
"Signs"
"Swarm"
"Get Up"
"Mountain Path"
"Day by Day"
"Soaring Beyond"
"Sajanna"
"Tribal"
"Bang"
"Last Mile"
"Appa"

References

Badmarsh & Shri albums
2001 albums